Black Sports was a monthly magazine which was launched in April 1971 in New York City and closed later that decade.

It was the first major sports magazine aimed specifically at African Americans. The magazine was the brainchild of Allan P. Barron, who became president and editor. Barron teamed up with William L. Doneghy, who was vice-president and controller. In 1971, Bryant Gumbel became editor, leaving the following year.

The magazine had low circulation and limited success and was forced to close after the final issue was published in June 1978.

References

External links
 Black Sports Magazine, Vol. 1, No. 1 at the National Museum of African American History and Culture

African-American magazines
Monthly magazines published in the United States
Sports magazines published in the United States
Defunct magazines published in the United States
Magazines established in 1971
Magazines disestablished in 1978
Magazines published in New York City